The Fight may refer to:

In film and television:
 "The Fight" (The Office), a 2005 episode of The Office
 "The Fight" (Star Trek: Voyager), a 1999 episode of Star Trek: Voyager
 "The Fight" (How I Met Your Mother), an episode of How I Met Your Mother
 "The Fight" (Parks and Recreation), an  episode of Parks and Recreation
 The Fight: Science Against Cancer, a 1950 Canadian documentary film
 The Fight (2018 film), a British family drama film
 The Fight (2020 film), an American documentary film

In Literature:
 The Fight (book), a 1975 non-fiction book by Norman Mailer
 "The Fight", 1822 essay by William Hazlitt; early discourse on "popular culture" 

Other uses:
 The Fight (band), a band from the UK
 "The Fight", a song by Avenged Sevenfold on the album Diamonds in the Rough
 "The Fight", a song by Sia on the album We Are Born
 The Fight: Lights Out, a 2010 PlayStation Move game
 Philadelphia Fight, an American rugby league team

See also

 Fight (disambiguation)